In particle physics the semileptonic decay of a hadron is a decay caused by the weak force in which one lepton (and the corresponding neutrino) is produced in addition to one or more hadrons. An example for this can be
 →  +  + 

This is to be contrasted with purely hadronic decays, such as  →  + , which are also mediated by the weak force.

Semileptonic decays of neutral kaons have been used to study kaon oscillations.

See also
Kaon
Pion
CP violation
CPT symmetry

Electroweak theory